The 1985 Ms. Olympia contest was an IFBB professional bodybuilding competition was held on November 30, 1985, at the Felt Forum in Madison Square Garden in New York City, New York. It was the sixth Ms. Olympia competition held.

Results

Scorecard

Notable Events

 The event, staged for the first time in New York, was witnessed by a crowd of 5,114, largest ever in the six-year history of the competition.
 For the first time, the women were tested for steroids and everybody passed.

See also
 1985 Mr. Olympia

References

 Everson Retains Ms. Olympia Title
 History of the Ms. Olympia
 1985 Ms Olympia Results

External links
 Competitor History of the Ms. Olympia

Ms Olympia, 1985
Ms. Olympia
Ms. Olympia
History of female bodybuilding

es:Ms. Olympia
it:Ms. Olympia
he:גברת אולימפיה
nl:Ms. Olympia
pl:Ms. Olympia
pt:Ms. Olympia
sv:Ms. Olympia